is a 2017 Japanese romantic comedy film, written and directed by Shingo Matsumura.

Plot 
Rinko and Isamo are separated, living together in the same apartment. In finalising their separation, Rinko is still not quite ready to give up on the relationship, and perhaps Isamo is showing signs as well. Until Isamo's workmate starts to show signs of interest in him. The story is centred around the pair's attendance to a wedding in Hawaii, which brings matters to a head.

Cast 
Aya Ayano
Kentaro Tamura
Risa Kameda
Aoi Kato
Momoka Ayukawa

References

External links
 

2017 films
2010s Japanese-language films
Japanese romantic comedy films
2010s Japanese films